Erika Lynn Harlacher-Stone (born August 29, 1990)  is an American voice actress based in the Los Angeles area who has provided voices for English dubbed Japanese anime shows and video games. Some of her major roles in anime include: Yugo in Wakfu, Ami Kawashima in Toradora!, Mimori Togo in Yuki Yuna is a Hero, Asseylum Vers Allusia in Aldnoah.Zero, Elizabeth Liones in The Seven Deadly Sins, Kurapika in Hunter × Hunter, Violet in Violet Evergarden, and Yumeko in Kakegurui – Compulsive Gambler.  In video games, she provides the voice of Kyoko Kirigiri and Kaede Akamatsu in the Danganronpa video game series, Venti in Genshin Impact, Juna Crawford in The Legend of Heroes: Trails of Cold Steel III and IV, Ayesha in Atelier Ayesha: The Alchemist of Dusk, Ann Takamaki in Persona 5, and Raging Bull in Ys IX: Monstrum Nox.

Biography
Harlacher grew up in Camarillo, California, and started acting in school plays. When she was around 9–10 years old, she was inspired by an interview by Christy Carlson Romano, who voiced the title character from Kim Possible, in which Romano said that with voice acting, you could go to work in your pajamas. Erika's mother responded that it was not a real job, and suggested Erika pursue acting only as a hobby. Her first exposure to anime was through Dragon Ball Z and Pokémon, which she considered more like cartoons, and that she really got into manga and anime in school when Fruits Basket was being published in English. At La Reina High School, she was active in the Speech and Mock Trial team, which was noted statewide and even attended a national event. She also competed on the school's diving team.

After graduating high school in 2008, she attended California State Polytechnic University, Pomona where she intended to major in graphic design. During her freshman year, she looked up some online forums regarding voice-over and attended Anime Expo, where she learned about and attended an Adventures in Voice Acting workshop conducted by Tony Oliver. On Oliver's suggestion that she was pretty good at it, she changed her major to theatre,  and continued to take voice acting lessons and workshops while studying at school. She also did a production internship at Bang Zoom! Entertainment where she got to sit in on some of the recording sessions. Her first voice acting project was on K-On!, where she voiced Keiko Ida, among some other incidental characters. Her first big voice-over role was for the Battleship video game, based on the 2012 movie of the same name, where she got to voice the main character, Grace Harland, among many veteran voice actors. However, video game reviewers panned the game because none of the movie's actors reprised their roles in the game, and faulted the game's limited acting, which was relegated to mostly radio chatter and mission updates. At one point in college, she had some health issues that led her to take an absence from school and acting, so she pursued production work, which her parents thought would make for a more practical career. She later dropped it as she was encouraged by Oliver to pursue acting and to finish school, eventually landing the lead role as Ayesha in the video game Atelier Ayesha: The Alchemist of Dusk. She described Ayesha as a bit airheaded and ditsy but relatable and resembles her personality at times. Video game reviewer Sean Madson of Diehardgamefan found the dub to be of decent quality, but said Ayesha "sounded a bit too obnoxious with her airheadedness." Matt Sainsbury of Digitally Downloaded thought the dub was reasonable but disliked their American accents as not suiting the Japanese personality of the game. Vince Ingenito of IGN wrote that "both the writing and voice acting fail to lend any weight to her plight. Ayesha seems about as upset over her missing sister as I might be over a glass of spilled milk, making it really hard to care about the outcome of her quest." She also voiced Sadira, a spider-themed woman and new character to the Killer Instinct series.

In 2014, Harlacher voiced Kyoko Kirigiri in Danganronpa: Trigger Happy Havoc. She described Kyoko as the most calm among the wacky characters and always on top of things. Video game reviewers thought the voice acting was okay. In the same year, she voiced Blood Leopard in Accel World, who was similar to Kyoko's stoic disposition. In Sword Art Online, she voiced Sasha, whom she describes as being like a teacher/nun lady who is in charge of the kids who are lost in the game. In the second season of Sword Art Online, she voiced Siune. She also began attending anime conventions as a guest panelist. In voicing Dunya in the Magi: The Labyrinth of Magic series, she found her character to be not your average princess, and that she was fun because she was unpredictable. Her biggest role that year was Ami Kawashima in the romantic comedy Toradora!, a classmate who harbors a mean and bratty personality behind a cheerful perfect-looking facade of a model. As it was one of NIS America's first dub productions for anime, She said they took a long time to call back from the audition, and that it also took more time than other studios in producing the dub for the show. She describes Ami's character as trying to act like she knows what she's doing but does not really have it together, and also her lack of culinary talent. LB Bryant of Japanator said that the Toradora dub release is a "must obtain" item and that "Ami Kawashima equals best girl." Travis Bruno of Capsule Computers said the English dub cast did impressively well and those who only listen to the Japanese tracks would be missing out. She also voiced Mako's mother, Sukuyo Mankanshoku in Kill la Kill, which later ran on Adult Swim's Toonami block in 2015. She described the series as crazy, the Mankanshoku family as ridiculous, and that Sukuyo is very sweet by constantly providing everyone food.

In 2015, Harlacher voiced Mimori Togo in Yuki Yuna is a Hero, one of the main heroines who are called to save their world by interacting in an alternate dimension where they have super powers. She described Togo as going through a lot of emotional stuff, which helped her expand her acting range. Anime News Network reviewer Theron Martin said that the cast was "appropriately chosen for their roles in a vocal quality sense and handled the acting capably." In the same year, she voiced main character Princess Asseylum Vers Allusia in Aldnoah.Zero as well as Elizabeth in The Seven Deadly Sins, both of which had English dub premieres on Netflix. She attended Sac-Anime in Sacramento, California; the panel she was on was regarded as one of the highlights of the convention. Manga Entertainment listed Harlacher among their top 5 English voice actresses. In 2016, she landed the voice role of main character Kurapika in the Viz Media English dub of the 2011 anime adaptation of Hunter x Hunter, which premiered on the Toonami block in April. In 2017, she voiced Ann Takamaki, one of the core player characters in the video game Persona 5.

In 2018, Harlacher voiced main characters in two Netflix-streamed anime series: Violet in Violet Evergarden and Yumeko Jabami in Kakegurui – Compulsive Gambler. In the same year, she landed the role of main character Yugo in the third season of Wakfu: The Animated Series. She also voiced Ondine in season 2 of Miraculous: Tales of Ladybug and Cat Noir. In 2019, Harlacher starred as Sakura Yamauchi in the English dub of the feature anime film I Want to Eat Your Pancreas.

Personal life
Harlacher lives in North Hollywood in the Los Angeles area. In 2014, she started a Let's Play video channel on YouTube, where she plays through various games, some of which she has starred in, and others just for fun. She has a younger sister Natalie. She also owns two dogs. On October 14, 2020, she married long-time partner Luke Stone. Her paternal grandfather, Ervin Harlacher, was the first president of Brookdale Community College.

Filmography

Anime

Film
{| class="wikitable sortable"
|+List of voice performances in films
|-
! Year !! Title !! Role !! Notes !! Source
|-
|  || Oblivion Island: Haruka and the Magic Mirror || Additional Voices || Production assistant ||
|-
|  || The Seven Deadly Sins the Movie: Prisoners of the Sky || Elizabeth Liones || ||
|-
|  || I Want to Eat Your Pancreas || Sakura Yamauchi || Limited theatrical release || 
|-
|  || A Whisker Away || Yoriko Fukase || Netflix dub || 
|-
|  || Ni no Kuni || Miki Midorikawa || Netflix dub || 
|-
|  || Violet Evergarden: Eternity and the Auto Memory Doll || Violet Evergarden || || 
|-
|  || Digimon Adventure: Last Evolution Kizuna || Menoa Belluci || ||
|-
|  || Demon Slayer: Kimetsu no Yaiba – The Movie: Mugen Train || Shinobu Kocho || || 
|-

|}

Video games

Animation

Discography

Singles
 300 Days -
 I Finally Do'' -

References

External links

1990 births
Living people
American voice actresses
American video game actresses
American YouTubers
Actresses from California
People from Camarillo, California
California State Polytechnic University, Pomona alumni
21st-century American actresses